Noppawan Lertcheewakarn and Varatchaya Wongteanchai were the defending champions having won the event in 2015, but Wongteanchai chose to participate at the 2017 Summer Universiade instead. 

Nicha Lertpitaksinchai and Peangtarn Plipuech won the gold medals, defeating Luksika Kumkhum and Lertcheewakarn in an all-Thai final, 1–6, 6–3, [10–8].

Jawairiah Noordin and Theiviya Selvarajoo of Malaysia, and Denise Dy and Katharina Lehnert of the Philippines won the bronze medals.

Medalists

Seeds

Draw

External links
 Draw

Women's Doubles
South
South